Jordanita vartianae is a moth of the family Zygaenidae. It is endemic to southern and central Spain.

The length of the forewings is 13.7–14.7 mm for males and 9.0–9.5 mm for females.

References

C. M. Naumann, W. G. Tremewan: The Western Palaearctic Zygaenidae. Apollo Books, Stenstrup 1999,

External links
Fauna Europaea
The Barcode of Life Data Systems (BOLD)

Procridinae
Endemic fauna of Spain
Moths described in 1961